Mayzel is a Jewish surname. Notable people, with the surname include:

Boris Mayzel (1907–1986), Soviet composer
 (1887-1966), Russian-Jewish/American/Israeli Yiddish editor and literary critic 
Sergey Mayzel (1907–1955), Soviet physicist
Wacław Mayzel (1847–1916), Polish histologist

Fictional characters
Professor Mayzel (Spriggan) from Spriggan manga

See also

Maysles
Meisl
Meisel
Maizels
Maizel
Maisel
Mazel

ru:Майзель

Jewish surnames